Valbo is a locality situated in Gävle Municipality, Gävleborg County, Sweden with 7,065 inhabitants in 2010. It is situated south-west of Gävle itself and could be considered a suburb of the city.

Valbo is known for the large shopping mall Valbo köpcentrum and for being the birthplace of Stanley Cup champion Nicklas Bäckström.

Valbo parish
Valbo is also a parish within the Church of Sweden, which has 11,600 members in the town and surrounding area in the eastern part of Gävle Municipality.

Education
 Sofiedalskolan (Sofiedal School) Is an upper (senior) level of compulsory school and it is located in the central parts of Valbo and it has around 550 students, The school also has an intermediate level and also the first three years of compulsory school for students.
 Ludvigsbergsskolan (Ludvigsberg School) is located in the central parts of Valbo and it has the first three years of compulsory school for students and also an intermediate level. The school has around 400 students.
 Alborga skola (Alborga School) is located in the north of Valbo and it has the first three years of compulsory school for students with about 100 students

Häcklingeskolan (Häcklinge School) was closed in 2005 and the students were transferred to the Sofiedal school

Sports
The following sports clubs are located in Valbo:

 Valbo FF
 Valbo AIF
 Valbo IBF
 Valbo HC

Notable people  
 Nicklas Bäckström - hockey player and Stanley Cup champion.
 Andreas Dackell - hockey player.
 Christian Lundeberg - Prime Minister of Sweden.

References 

Populated places in Gävle Municipality
Gästrikland